Mount Suydam is a mountain in Antarctica, 1,020 m, standing 3 nautical miles (6 km) west of Clark Ridge in Anderson Hills in northern Patuxent Range, Pensacola Mountains. It was mapped by the United States Geological Survey (USGS) from surveys and U.S. Navy air photos from 1956 to 1966. It was named by the Advisory Committee on Antarctic Names (US-ACAN) for E. Lynn Suydam, a biologist at Palmer Station during the winter of 1967.

Mountains of Queen Elizabeth Land
Pensacola Mountains